Chern is an urban locality (an urban-type settlement) in Chernsky District of Tula Oblast, Russia. Population:

References

Urban-type settlements in Tula Oblast
Chernsky Uyezd